Elmer Hewitt Capen (April 5, 1838 – March 22, 1905) was the third president of Tufts College (now Tufts University), serving from 1875 to 1905. He was born in Stoughton, Massachusetts. Capen graduated from Tufts in 1860, and while there he was a founding member of the Kappa Charge of Theta Delta Chi. Also, in 1859, while still an undergraduate, he was elected to, and served in, the Massachusetts House of Representatives. He relinquished his seat after one term in order to finish his studies and graduate with his class. After his graduation from Tufts, he studied at Harvard Law School, practiced law for a short time, and then became a Universalist minister.

Capen presided over the continued expansion of course and program offerings at Tufts, and the beginning of co-education (over his own objections) in 1892. He died in office on March 22, 1905. A bronze bust of Capen remains in Tufts' Goddard Chapel. The residence he constructed for himself and his family while president, at 8 Professors Row, is still known as Capen House. His wife was Mary Leavitt Edwards (1860-1944; married to Sumner Robinson following Elmer Capen's death). Elmer and Mary's only son, Samuel Paul Capen (1878-1956) also graduated from Tufts, and made significant contributions to the field of higher education; he became the first Director of the American Council on Education.

References

Sources
Elmer Hewitt Capen, 1875 - Tufts Interactive Timeline

1838 births
1905 deaths
Presidents of Tufts University
Members of the Massachusetts House of Representatives
People from Stoughton, Massachusetts
Tufts University alumni
Harvard Law School alumni
20th-century Christian universalists
19th-century Christian universalists
Clergy of the Universalist Church of America
19th-century American politicians
19th-century American clergy